David Petrikin (December 1, 1788 – March 1, 1847) was a Democratic member of the U.S. House of Representatives from Pennsylvania.

David Petrikin was born in Bellefonte, Pennsylvania.  He studied medicine and was admitted to practice.  He moved to Danville, Pennsylvania, and engaged in the practice of medicine.  During the War of 1812, he served as a surgeon with the Second Regiment of the Pennsylvania Riflemen.  After the war returned to Danville and continued the practice of medicine.  He also erected and operated a woolen mill.  He was elected prothonotary of Columbia County, Pennsylvania, on March 15, 1821.  He was a member of the Pennsylvania House of Representatives.  He served as postmaster of Danville from February 1, 1834, to March 21, 1837.

Petrikin was elected as a Democrat to the Twenty-fifth and Twenty-sixth Congresses.  He served as the chairman of the United States House Committee on Public Buildings and Grounds during the Twenty-sixth Congress.  He died in Catawissa, Pennsylvania, in 1847.  Interment in Petrikin Cemetery in Danville, which was later converted into a memorial park.

Sources

The Political Graveyard

1788 births
1847 deaths
Democratic Party members of the Pennsylvania House of Representatives
United States Army personnel of the War of 1812
United States Army Medical Corps officers
People from Danville, Pennsylvania
People from Columbia County, Pennsylvania
Pennsylvania prothonotaries
Pennsylvania postmasters
Democratic Party members of the United States House of Representatives from Pennsylvania
19th-century American politicians